The 1965 NCAA University Division Outdoor Track and Field Championships were contested June 17−19 at the 43rd annual NCAA-sanctioned track meet to determine the individual and team national champions of men's collegiate University Division outdoor track and field events in the United States.

For the first time, the NCAA hosted a separate championship just for indoor track and field events. The inaugural event was contested at Cobo Arena in Detroit, Michigan and won by Missouri. Unlike the outdoor event in June, the indoor championship was contested during the NCAA's winter sports season.

This year's outdoor meet was hosted by the University of California at Edwards Stadium in Berkeley.

Oregon and USC finished tied in the team standings and were declared co-national champions; it was the Ducks' third title and the Trojans' twenty-third.

Team Result 
 Note: Top 10 only
 (H) = Hosts

References

NCAA Men's Outdoor Track and Field Championship
NCAA University Division Track and Field Championships
NCAA
NCAA University Division Track and Field Championships